The oxynitrides are a group of inorganic compounds containing oxygen and nitrogen not bound to each other, instead combined with other non-metallic or metallic elements. Some of these are oxosalts with oxygen replaced by nitrogen. Some of these compounds do not have a fixed oxygen to nitrogen ratio, but instead form ceramics with a range of compositions. They are in the class of mixed anion compounds.

Many can be formed by heating an oxide or carbonate with ammonia. The hydrogen can assist by reducing some of the oxygen. With higher temperatures and pressures nitrogen can be heated with a mixed oxide to yield a product. Other nitrogen rich compounds that can be heated with oxygen containing material are urea and melamine. For example urea heated with ammonium dihydrogen phosphate yields a phosphorus oxynitride.

There may not be a definite ratio of nitrogen to oxygen, and also nitrogen and oxygen may be disordered, swapping places at random.

Compared to oxides, the oxynitrides have a smaller band gap.

List

References

Oxygen compounds
Nitrides